The 2001 Chicago Bears season was their 82nd regular season and 23rd postseason completed in the National Football League. The team finished with a 13–3 record under head coach Dick Jauron en route to an NFC Central title and the number two seed in the NFC. With former 1st round pick Cade McNown being traded during training camp, the Bears were led by Jim Miller. The team had five comeback wins during the season, including two straight improbable wins where safety Mike Brown returned an interception for the game-winning touchdown in overtime. However, the Bears were upset at home by the Philadelphia Eagles 33–19 in the NFC Divisional playoffs.

Offseason

Draft choices

Staff

Roster

Season narrative 
The Bears surprised most with a breakout campaign in 2001. After losing the opening game of the season to the Super Bowl XXXV Champion Baltimore Ravens 17–6 on the road, the Bears won their next six games, starting with a 17–10 victory against their division rival, the Minnesota Vikings in the Bears’ home-opener. They carried their momentum through the Week 3 Bye and won on the road against the Atlanta Falcons (31–3).

The Bears returned home and won against the Arizona Cardinals 20–13. After a road shutout of the Cincinnati Bengals 24–0 the Bears played three home games. The first two games of this stretch were back-to-back overtime wins, first against the San Francisco 49ers (37–31), then against the Cleveland Browns (27–21). Both times safety Mike Brown capped remarkable comebacks (the Bears trailed 28–9 in the third quarter against San Francisco, and 21–7 with seconds remaining against Cleveland) by returning an interception in overtime for a touchdown.

Unfortunately the Green Bay Packers (their historic rival) buried the Bears’ win streak at home, 20–12. The Bears rebounded, winning their next three games. They first defeated then-division rival Tampa Bay 27–24. A season sweep of the Vikings (13–6) followed, then the Bears defended their turf against the Detroit Lions 13–10.

The Bears then traveled to Lambeau Field and were swept by the Packers 17–7. Once again the Bears rebounded, winning their last four games, against the Buccaneers at home (27–3), the Redskins (20–15), the Lions on the road (24–0), and then their season-finale against the Jacksonville Jaguars (33–13). The Bears ended the regular season with a 13–3 record.

The Bears entered the playoffs with the league's top defense (allowing a league-low 203 points), an offense ranked 11th in points scored (338 points), and a plus-13 turnover differential (4th in the league), but their magical season ended on a sour note, losing 33–19 to the Philadelphia Eagles in the divisional round of the NFC playoffs at Soldier Field.

Schedule 

Note: Intra-division opponents are in bold text.

Game summaries

Week 1

Week 2

Week 4

Week 5

Week 6

Week 7

Week 8

Week 9

Week 10

Week 11

Week 12 

    
    
    
    
    

After the winless Lions control play for most of the first half, Detroit kicker Jason Hanson misses three relatively easy field goals and the Bears recover their offense for a come-behind victory. The win moves the Bears to 9–2 but leave the Lions at 0–11 and looking down the barrel of the first 0–16 season in NFL history.

Week 13

Week 14

Week 15

Week 16 

    
    
    
    

Quarterback Miller controls play, and the Bear defence dominates Lion QB Ty Detmer, so that the Lions suffer a second home shutout for the first time since 1942. The Bears’ first playoff berth in eight seasons becomes settled and the team gains an opportunity to win the NFC Central – in the last year under that banner – for the first time since 1990.

Week 17 

The game's biggest highlight was defensive tackle Keith Traylor intercepting a Mark Brunell pass and returning it 67 yards setting up a David Terrell touchdown in the third quarter.

Standings

Playoffs

References

External links 

 2001 Chicago Bears Season at www.bearshistory.com

Chicago Bears
Chicago Bears seasons
NFC Central championship seasons
Bear
2000s in Chicago
2001 in Illinois